The Bega Standard and Candelo, Merimbula, Pambula, Eden, Wolumla, and General Advertiser, also previously published as Southern Standard, was a weekly, later semiweekly English language newspaper published in Bega, New South Wales, Australia.

Newspaper history 
The Bega Standard and Candelo, Merimbula, Pambula, Eden, Wolumla, and General Advertiser was published from 1874 to September 1923. Prior to this it was known as the Southern Standard and began in 1868. In 1923 the publication merged with The Bega Budget and The Southern Star to form Bega District News, which is a continuing publication.

Digitisation 
The Bega Standard and Candelo, Merimbula, Pambula, Eden, Wolumla, and General Advertiser has been digitised as part of the Australian Newspapers Digitisation Program of the National Library of Australia.

See also 
 List of newspapers in New South Wales
 List of newspapers in Australia

References

External links 
 
 
 Bega District News

Defunct newspapers published in New South Wales
Newspapers established in 1874
1874 establishments in Australia
Publications disestablished in 1923
1923 disestablishments in Australia
Newspapers on Trove